Aidoingus was a 5th-century Ostrogothic warrior. He was a member of the Amali dynasty, and an uncle of Sidimund. Aidoingus joined the Eastern Roman army, rising to the position of comes domesticorum

Sources
 

5th-century Ostrogothic people
Amali dynasty
5th-century Byzantine military personnel
Gothic warriors